Dewi Zephaniah Phillips (24 November 1934 – 25 July 2006), known as D. Z. Phillips or simply DZ, was a Welsh philosopher. He was a leading proponent of the Wittgensteinian philosophy of religion. He had an academic career spanning five decades, and at the time of his death he held the Danforth Chair in Philosophy of Religion at Claremont Graduate University, California, and was Professor Emeritus of Philosophy at Swansea University.

Biography
Dewi Zephaniah Phillips was born in Swansea, South Wales, on 24 November 1934. He was the youngest son of David and Alice Phillips, and one of three brothers. (He was predeceased by the Reverend Cadfan Phillips and Keri Phillips.) He attended the Bishop Gore School, Swansea, and studied at Swansea University (1952–58) and the University of Oxford (St Catherine's Society) (1958–61).

From 1959 until 1961 he was Minister of Fabian's Bay Congregational Church, Swansea. In 1959 he married Margaret Monica Hanford. They had three sons, Aled, Steffan and Rhys – and four grandchildren, Ceri, Bethan, Sian and Emyr.

Phillips began his academic career at Queen's College, Dundee, in 1961, before joining the University College of North Wales, Bangor, in 1963.

In 1965 he returned to Swansea University, to take up a lectureship in the Department of Philosophy. Promoted to a senior lectureship in 1967, he became professor and head of department in 1971. He also served as Dean of the Faculty of Arts (1982–1985) and as a Vice-Principal (1989–1992).

In 1993 he was appointed Danforth Professor of Philosophy of Religion at the Claremont Graduate University in California, and thereafter divided his time between Claremont and Swansea where, in 1996, he became the Rush Rhees Professor Emeritus and Director of the Rush Rhees Archives and Peter Winch Archives based in Swansea University. He held both positions until his death in 2006. 

Phillips gave many endowed lectures during his tenure at California's Claremont Graduate University. These included the Cardinal Mercier Lectures (Leuven), Marett Lecture (Oxford), Riddell Lectures (Newcastle), McMartin Lectures (Carleton University, in Ottawa), Hintz Lecture (Tucson), the Aquinas Lecture (Oxford), and Vonhoff Lectures (Groningen).

His teachers at Swansea – J. R. Jones, R. F. Holland, Peter Winch, and, most importantly, Rush Rhees inspired an untiring devotion to philosophy. His research interests included the philosophy of religion, ethics, philosophy and literature, Simone Weil, Søren Kierkegaard, and Ludwig Wittgenstein. He contributed much to Swansea University's reputation as a centre of Wittgenstein's philosophy. Indeed, Phillips's distinctive contribution to philosophy, and a handful of other philosophers associated with Swansea, is recognised among professional philosophers as "the Swansea school" of philosophy.

The Swansea school of thought is, perhaps, most thoroughly articulated as a positive research program in Phillips' own book on the subject, "Philosophy's Cool Place" (1999), in which he argues for the merits of "contemplative philosophy." On this view, philosophy is an activity involving both inquiries about reality and elucidations of the various contexts in which people live and speak. In contrast to the New Wittgenstein school of thought, philosophy is not limited to purely "therapeutic" treatments and the removing of philosophical confusion. Here, Phillips is primarily indebted to the work of Rush Rhees. For Phillips, what gives philosophy its unique disciplinary feature is its primary concern with the question of the nature of reality: "How can philosophy give an account of reality which shows that it is necessary to go beyond simply noting differences between various modes of discourse, without invoking a common measure of 'the real' or assuming that all modes of discourse have a common subject, namely, Reality?"

Outside philosophy and academia, his commitment to the language and culture of Wales was clear. He was instrumental in the founding of the Taliesin Arts Centre on the university campus in Swansea, and promoted the use of the Welsh language in local schools. He was honoured by membership of the Gorsedd Circle of the National Eisteddfod.

Phillips died of a heart attack in Swansea University Library, on 25 July 2006. He was 71.

Published works
D. Z. Phillips was perhaps best known for his publications in the philosophy of religion, but he has also published articles in ethics, philosophy and literature, Ludwig Wittgenstein and Welsh language publications in Welsh literature. He was editor of the journal Philosophical Investigations (Blackwells) and the Swansea Series in Philosophy (Palgrave), as well as the Claremont Studies in the Philosophy of Religion and Wittgensteinian Studies series. Selected publications:

Athronyddu Am Grefydd (Philosophising About Religion)
Belief, Change and Forms of Life
Concept of Prayer, The
Death and Immortality
Dramâu Gwenlyn Parry
Faith after Foundationalism
Faith and Philosophical Enquiry
From Fantasy to Faith
Ffiniau (Y Lolfa)
Interventions in Ethics, London: Blackwell, 1992
Introducing Philosophy: The Challenge of Scepticism
Kant and Kierkegaard on Religion (co-edited with Timothy Tessin)
Moral Practices (with H O Mounce)
Philosophy's Cool Place
Problem of Evil and the Problem of God (2005)
Recovering Religious Concepts
Religion and Friendly Fire
Religion and Hume's Legacy (co-edited with Timothy Tessin)
Religion and the Hermeneutics of Contemplation
Religion without Explanation
R.S. Thomas: Poet of the Hidden God
Sense and Delusion (with Ilham Dilman)
Through a Darkening Glass, Oxford: Basil Blackwell, 1982
Wittgenstein and Religion
Wittgensteinian Fideism? (Co-written with Kai Nielsen)

References

External links
 Interview conducted by Steven McMeans in Claremont California, 1995
 Obituary in The Guardian, 21 August 2006
 Obituary in The Independent, 9 August 2006
 Obituary in The Times, 18 August 2006

1934 births
2006 deaths
Analytic philosophers
Wittgensteinian philosophers
Welsh philosophers
Alumni of Swansea University
People from Morriston
People from Swansea
People educated at Bishop Gore School
20th-century British philosophers
20th-century Welsh writers
20th-century Welsh educators
21st-century British philosophers
21st-century Welsh writers
21st-century Welsh educators